Mundowran is a rural locality in the North Burnett Region, Queensland, Australia. In the  Mundowran had a population of 122 people.

Geography
The Burnett Highway enters the locality from the east, passes south through a small area, and then forms the south-eastern, southern and south-western boundaries before continuing to the west. The Mundubbera Durong Road (State Route 75) runs south from the Burnett Highway through Mundubbera.

History 
Mundowran State School opened on 26 March 1913 and closed in 1960.

In the  Mundowran had a population of 122 people.

References 

North Burnett Region
Localities in Queensland